Chekurovka was a Arctic military airfield in Sakha Republic, Russia located 89 km southwest of Tiksi. It is a remote, large bomber staging base that was either abandoned during construction or commissioned for emergency use.  It was probably built around 1960 as a forward deployment base for the Soviet Union's strategic bomber force and abandoned shortly afterward.  Its status and condition are unknown.

Reconnaissance imagery showed that two aircraft were observed on the air base in 1968.

See also
 Aspidnoye (air base), abandoned Arctic staging base
 Ostrov Bolshevik (air base), abandoned Arctic staging base
 Tiksi North Air Base, abandoned Arctic staging base
 Tiksi West Airfield, abandoned Arctic staging base

References

Soviet Long Range Aviation Arctic staging bases
Airports in the Sakha Republic